Sun Belt Championship or Sun Belt Tournament may refer to:

Sun Belt men's basketball tournament, men's basketball championship
Sun Belt Conference women's basketball tournament, women's basketball championship
Sun Belt baseball tournament, baseball championship
Sun Belt Conference Football Championship Game, college football championship